State Road 589 (SR 589), also known as the Veterans Expressway and Suncoast Parkway, is a north–south toll road near the Florida Gulf Coast.  Maintained and operated by Florida's Turnpike Enterprise, this  transportation corridor extends from State Road 60 in Tampa, north to State Road 44 near Lecanto.  The Veterans Expressway was built to accommodate the increasing commuter traffic in the Tampa-St. Petersburg metropolitan area, with the Suncoast Parkway opening in 2001, extending from near the northern terminus of the Veterans Expressway to U.S. Route 98, with a possible northern extension to U.S. Route 19/U.S. Route 98 in Crystal River in Citrus County in the planning and development stages. As of February 28, 2022, Phase I of the extension is now open between US 98 and Florida State Road 44. Phase II, which would further extend the highway to County Road 486, is undergoing the design phase.

Route description

Veterans Expressway
The Veterans Expressway extends  from State Road 60 (the Courtney Campbell Causeway) west of Tampa International Airport to Van Dyke Road in northern Hillsborough County.  The southern two miles (3 km), between Courtney Campbell Causeway and Hillsborough Avenue (on the west side of Tampa International Airport), upgraded Eisenhower Boulevard to expressway standards with frontage roads and is not tolled.  North of Hillsborough Avenue, the remaining  are tolled.

Between Courtney Campbell Causeway and Van Dyke Road, intermediate interchanges are provided at Independence Parkway, Memorial Highway, Hillsborough Avenue, Waters Avenue, Anderson Road, Linebaugh Avenue/Wilsky Boulevard, Gunn Highway, Ehrlich Road, Hutchison Road and Dale Mabry (known as the spur). There are two mainline SunPass gantries (Anderson and Sugarwood) and six ramp plazas.  The Veterans Expressway converted to all-electronic, cashless tolling in 2014.  Drivers must have a SunPass or they will be billed with TOLL-BY-PLATE.  The "N minus 1" formula is used for multiaxle vehicles on all Turnpike facilities except for the ticket system on the Turnpike mainline and the T ramp on the I-4 Connector.  N minus 1 may be calculated by counting the number of axles, minus 1, times the passenger car toll rate at each plaza.

Suncoast Parkway
The 55-mile-long Suncoast Parkway (SR 589) proceeds north from the Veterans Expressway to SR 44 in Citrus County, Florida, near Lecanto.

The Suncoast Parkway is the first Florida's Turnpike Enterprise toll road to feature open road tolling.  The three mainline toll plazas on the Suncoast Parkway feature bypasses where those paying cash remain on the mainline and stop at the toll plaza while those with Sunpass or related transponders exit the mainline roadway, bypass the toll plaza and then re-enter the mainline.  This differs from other open road tolling locations in Florida where transponder users remain on the mainline and bypass toll booths built to the side.

Suncoast Trail

As part of the Suncoast Parkway project, a multi-use paved recreational trail called the Suncoast Trail was constructed parallel to the western side of the highway, and opened along with the Parkway itself in 2001. Four miles north of State Road 54, an additional 6.5-mile paved bicycle trail connects the Suncoast Trail to the J. B. Starkey Wilderness Park in New Port Richey. Use of the Suncoast Trail is free, but in late 2010, a $2.00 parking fee was implemented at the Lutz-Lake Fern trailhead (Hillsborough County). At the same time, Pasco County implemented a parking fee, but it was rescinded in late 2017. Motor vehicles are prohibited along the entire trail, except for Park Rangers, and other authorized vehicles.

For most of its length, the Suncoast Trail stays close to the parkway, separated by fences, grass, and in some places concrete barriers.  Bridges that cross rivers and streams were built with enough width to accommodate trail users.  Where roads cross above the parkway, particularly north of State Road 52, the trail briefly strays from the parkway, allowing users to cross the intersecting road at-grade.

Pedestrian and cyclist crossing of minor cross streets is regulated by posted signs. At busier intersections, pedestrian crossing signals are part of the traffic signal systems already in place.

Tolls
The Veterans Expressway is an all-electronic toll road and does not accept cash.  It ceased cash collection in June 2014.

The Suncoast Parkway was the first of Florida's Turnpike Enterprise expressways to feature open-road tolling when it opened in 2001.  However, unlike roads that were later converted into open-road tolling, the SunPass transponder users must turn their vehicle onto an off-ramp while cash users stay on the main highway route at toll plazas. During a resurfacing project in 2012-2013, the lanes were reconfigured, and signage modified, to give the outer SunPass lanes the appearance of being the primary route. Access to the booths on the inner part of the roadway, was reduced to a single lane.

Toll rates were adjusted statewide on October 29, 2017. In January 2020, the Suncoast Parkway stopped accepting cash payment of tolls, converting fully to SunPass and Toll-By-Plate.

History

Veterans Expressway
The Veterans Expressway is the north-south portion of what was the Northwest Hillsborough Expressway, originally proposed in the 1960s as the northwest beltway around Tampa's outer limits.  As the plans finalized, the communities along the route grew, leading to rising land costs and opposition to the expressway dividing the towns.  Lutz was especially vocal, eventually rallying state politicians to cancel the expressway construction altogether.  By the mid-1980s, the expressway was broken in two segments, the Veterans Expressway and the Lutz Expressway.  In the early 1990s, the Tampa-Hillsborough Expressway Authority began to build the Veterans Expressway, but was depleted of funds, leading to Florida's Turnpike Enterprise purchasing the right of way using the existing design to complete construction of the expressway.  State Road 589 was designated the Veterans Expressway in 1992 and was completed in October 1994.

From its opening in 1994, the Veterans Expressway saw very little changes in its roadway configuration. When the Suncoast Parkway was constructed in 1998 (through 2001), the Van Dyke Road interchange was reconfigured.

Former sections
With the completion of the Suncoast Parkway in 2001, the stub of the Veterans Expressway from Exit 13 to Dale Mabry Highway was designated State Road 568.

Originally, State Road 589 was concurrent with State Road 60 between Exit 2A and Exit 1, then extended to West Spruce Street and Boy Scout Boulevard.  These roads were re-designated as SR 616.

South of the southern terminus, SR 589 was planned to be branched off onto the West Crosstown Expressway and become part of the Lee Roy Selmon Expressway, at the Selmon Expressway's Exit 4. The West Crosstown was canceled due to a freeway revolt, and the SR 589 and SR 449 designations were eliminated from the Lee Roy Selmon Expressway.

Suncoast Parkway

Construction began on the Suncoast Parkway in 1998, and opened in 2001 in two stages at a cost of $507 million.  The section from the Veterans Expressway to State Road 50 opened in February 2001 and the section from State Road 50 north to U.S. Route 98 opened in August 2001.

Tampa Airport interchanges

In August 2005, a massive reconstruction project began on the interchanges between I-275 and Memorial Highway, near Tampa International Airport after being shelved for over fifteen years. The project consisted of a four-level stack interchange at the Spruce St Interchange, a three-level interchange at the Courtney Campbell Causeway, and an extensive auxiliary exit ramp system stretching from Independence Pkwy to just north of I-275.  The first phase, dealing with the northbound lanes to the airport was completed on March 31, 2010, at a cost of $202 million. The second phase, which upgrades the southbound lanes, is currently in the early design stages and there is currently no timetable set for construction.

The project has resulted in better access from southbound Veterans Expressway to the Courtney Campbell Causeway on State Road 60, the Airport to I-275 and the WestShore Business District.

As of August 2007 video cameras have been added on the road every 10th of a mile down the span of the toll road.

Widening of the Veterans Expressway, All-Electronic Tolling, and Express Lanes
This improvement project, which began May 2013, widens 11 miles (17.7 km) of the Veterans Expressway between Memorial Hwy and Van Dyke Rd. The improvements, which are divided into five separate projects, double the capacity of the highway from four to eight lanes. Part of the widening improvements include reconstruction of 38 existing bridges and the building of three new bridges.

The widening project also includes a concurrent project to convert the section from Memorial Highway to Van Dyke Road to all-electronic tolling (AET) providing non-stop travel. In addition, the conversion of the Suncoast Parkway to AET will occur concurrent with the expansion into Citrus County, thereby providing enhanced benefits to drivers using the entire Toll 589 corridor. The project introduces Express Lanes (also known as Managed Lanes) to the region. A congestion management tool (which is already in place along parts of I-95 and I-595 in Miami), Express Lanes offer motorists a choice that provides an opportunity for a faster through-trip, with greater trip reliability and safety. All-Electronic tolling is being implemented in segments while the widening project continues. This latter process began in June, 2014.

The new Linebaugh southbound on-ramp opened in early summer 2015. The Anderson Road exit was reconstructed to accommodate widening the mainline roadway under the bridge.  The southbound on-ramp opened in spring 2015, with the northbound off-ramp following by early summer. On the night of June 13, 2014, the segment between Memorial Highway and Gunn Highway converted to All-Electronic Toll Collection. On September 5, 2014, the segment between Gunn Highway and Hutchison Road was converted.

On December 9, 2017, the first phase of the Express Lanes, between Gunn Hwy and Hillsborough Ave, opened to traffic. The lanes will not be subjected to the variable rate toll until closer to the time that the second phase from Gunn Hwy to Dale Mabry opens.

While the reconstruction of the Veterans wrapped up in 2018, the Florida's Turnpike Enterprise still has not activated variable tolling for the express lanes. As of October, 2021, the agency is converting the lanes to general purpose "Thru Lanes", similar to that of portions of the Beachline Expressway. Lane dividers will remain intact, but signage will change to reflect the conversion.

Future

Suncoast Parkway extension 
A planned expansion project of the Suncoast Parkway will feature a 13-mile extension from US 98 to State Road 44 in Citrus County, providing the Parkway's extension into that county.

The project follows a northerly route, paralleling US 19 and CR 491.  Three interchanges are proposed:  completion of the US 98 interchange, a new interchange at Cardinal Road and a partial interchange at SR 44.  The extension will be an all-electronic, cashless toll facility.

The extension will be implemented under two separate projects to be let as design-bid-build contracts in 2016. Estimated project costs are $135 million, opening on February 28, 2022.

The original expansion plans featured an additional 15-mile extension from SR 44 to US 19; however, this portion remains unfunded with no timetable for its beginning.

Possible Extension towards Jacksonville 

FDOT is currently evaluating the possibility of further extending the Suncoast Parkway to create a seamless, limited access, tolled highway between Tampa and Jacksonville. The highway would be able to connect to I-75 either near the Ocala/Gainesville area, or near Lake City, then possibly I-10, the First Coast Expressway, and/or I-95 as it enters the Jacksonville metro area. Currently, those wishing to make a trip between Tampa and Jacksonville can use I-4 to I-95, I-75 to I-10, or various surface roads such as U.S. 301.

Criticism
The Suncoast Parkway (both the existing route and the newly opened extension) has raised criticism from several opponents.

Citrus County residents believe that the extension would disrupt the quiet, undisturbed sections of Citrus County and bring forth more urban sprawl to the county.  Furthermore, impacted residents fear that the parkway alignments come too close to their residences and will cause excessive noise and decreased property values.

Historic preservation groups oppose the extension as the planned alignment would essentially wipe out the Etna Turpentine Camp Archeological Site, which is on the National Register of Historic Places.  In addition, a planned alignment threatens an underground water supply for the Homosassa Special Water District.

Furthermore, the toll estimates for the original Suncoast Parkway have fallen far below expectations (actual revenues USD$22M vs. USD$150M estimated), leading Tampa Bay Times columnist Craig Pittman to ask why an extension is needed on a road that has had far fewer users than planned.

Exit list

References

External links

Tampa Airport Interchanges Project Page 
Suncoast Parkway Proposed Extension Project Page and map
Florida Route Log(SR 589)
Cancelled Veterans Expressway Extension
Florida @ SouthEastRoads - Florida 589
 Suncoast Trail at 100 Florida Trails

State highways in Florida
Toll roads in Florida
State Roads in Hillsborough County, Florida
State Roads in Pasco County, Florida
State Roads in Hernando County, Florida
Parkways in the United States
Florida State Road 589
Florida Scenic Highways